Angiola Teresa Moratori Scanabecchi (1662 – 19 April 1708) was an Italian composer and painter.

Biography
Angiola Moratori was born in Bologna, the daughter of a Bolognese physician, and married Tomaso Scanabecchi Monetta. She studied instrumental performance, singing and painting and composed oratorios, the scores of which have been lost. Her paintings are housed in churches, Santo Stefano in Bologna, San Giovanni in Monte in Bologna, Madonna di Galliera in Bologna, and San Domenico in Ferrara. Scanabecchi died in Bologna and is buried in Madonna di Galliera beneath her painting of St. Tommaso.

Works
Selected musical works, each with libretto by Giancomo Antonio Bergamori, include:
 Il martirio di Santo Colomba (1689)
 Li giochi di Sansone (1694)
 L’Esterre (1695)
 Cristo morto (1696)

References

Italian Baroque composers
Italian women classical composers
1662 births
1708 deaths
17th-century Italian painters
17th-century Italian composers
17th-century Italian women
18th-century Italian painters
18th-century Italian composers
18th-century Italian women artists
18th-century women composers
17th-century women composers